Petr Vaníček (born 18 July 1935) is a Czech Canadian geodesist and theoretical geophysicist who has made important breakthroughs in theory of spectrum analysis and geoid computation.

Main contributions

Research

One of Vaníček's main contributions of general relevance is least-squares spectral analysis, also called the Vaníček method and the Gauss-Vaniček method — a frequency spectrum computation method published in 1969 and 1971. It is based on a least-squares fit of sinusoids to the data samples, and mitigates the drawbacks of applying Fourier analysis for analyzing long incomplete data records such as most natural datasets. Unlike with Fourier analysis, data need not be equally spaced to use Vaníček analysis.

His discoveries in theoretical geophysics, the "precise geoid solution" in particular, enable millimetre-to-centimetre accuracy in geoid computation, an-order-of-magnitude improvement from previous solutions.

Service
Vaníček initiated the establishing of the Canadian Geophysical Union in 1974, and served as the Union's president between 1987 and 1989.

He was the first chairperson of the United Nations committee for Geodetic Aspects of the Law of the Sea (GALOS), founded in Edinburgh, Scotland, by the International Association of Geodesy (IAG) in 1989.

This and other activities led to creation of the technical supplement to the Law of the Sea, TALOS (Manual on Technical Aspects of the United Nations' Convention on the Law of the Sea) in 1982, which is on a regular re-issuing schedule by the UN. The Geodetic Commentary to the TALOS Manual, largely prepared by Vaníček and published by the International Hydrographic Organization in 1996, was incorporated into the Manual.

The book Geodesy: The Concepts, by Vaníček and Krakiwsky, now translated into several languages, is a standard text for both undergraduate and graduate courses in geodesy worldwide.

Vaníček also served as editor-in-chief and peer-reviewer for several scientific journals as well as on numerous scientific boards and committees.

Awards and recognitions

International
Petr Vaníček is a fellow of the International Union of Geodesy and Geophysics, of the American Geophysical Union, and of the Czechoslovak Society of Arts and Sciences (SVU). He was the first Canadian awarded the Senior Distinguished Scientist Fellowship by the Alexander von Humboldt Foundation, and was a Senior Visiting Scientist with the U.S. National Academy of Sciences.

Over the course of his career, he taught or performed research at universities and labs across six continents, including the Royal Institute of Technology and the USGS.

National
Petr Vaníček was awarded the J. Tuzo Wilson Medal in 1996, the highest recognition by the Canadian Geophysical Union, for his outstanding contributions to Canadian geophysics.

Personal life
Since he was born into a typical bourgeois family, Petr Vaníček's wife and children requested to leave Communist Czechoslovakia during the brief but liberal times of Prague Spring. They were granted exit visa just before the Soviet invasion of 1968. The family reunited in England where he was staying on a 1967 Senior Research Fellowship at the University of Liverpool. Together, they immigrated to Canada in 1969. He has one daughter and two sons.

He retired as Professor Emeritus in 2002, after more than thirty years of teaching at the University of Toronto and the University of New Brunswick. He lives in Fredericton, Canada.

See also
 List of geodesists
 List of geophysicists
 Science and technology in Canada

References

External links
On-line geodesy resources
Honoring the Academic Life of Petr Vaníček, (2002)
UN Division for Ocean Affairs and Law of the Sea, Accessed: 2 October 2007
Vaníček P., Krakiwsky E.J. Geodesy: the Concepts, pp. 714, Elsevier (1986)
Vaníček P., Christou N.T. Geoid and its Geophysical Interpretations, pp. 370, CRC Press (1993)
Dr. Petr Vaníček's home page at the University of New Brunswick, Canada, Accessed: 2 October 2007
Online Tutorial in Geodesy by Petr Vaniček . From: Associated Press Encyclopedia of Science & Technology (2001)

1935 births
Canadian physicists
20th-century Canadian scientists
21st-century Canadian scientists
Presidents of the Canadian Geophysical Union
University of New Brunswick
Academic staff of the University of New Brunswick
Academic staff of the University of Toronto
Academic staff of the KTH Royal Institute of Technology
Living people
Geophysicists
Geodesists
Fellows of the American Geophysical Union
Canadian educators
People from Sušice
Scientists from New Brunswick
Canadian geophysicists
Wilson Medal recipients
Earth scientists
20th-century earth scientists
21st-century earth scientists
Fellows of the International Union of Geodesy and Geophysics
Canadian academics
Canadian people of Czech descent
Czech emigrants to Canada
Naturalized citizens of Canada